Mezoneuron pubescens is a species of 'cat's claw' lianas, previously placed in the genus Caesalpinia, in the tribe Caesalpinieae.
This species is recorded from Malesia and Indo-China. with no subspecies.

References

External links

Caesalpinieae
Flora of Indo-China
Flora of Malesia